Sabri El-Sayed Abdalmonteleb Mayhoub Raheel (born on 2 October 1987) is an Egyptian professional footballer who plays as a left-back for Egyptian Premier League side Al Ittihad Alexandria. He also played for Al Ahly Zamalek.

Honours
Zamalek
 Egypt Cup: 2013

Al Ahly
 Egyptian Premier League: 2013–14, 2015–16, 2016–17, 2017–18, 2018–19
 Egypt Cup: 2017
 Egyptian Super Cup: 2014, 2015
 CAF Confederation Cup: 2014

References

External links
 
 Player Profile

1987 births
Living people
Al Ahly SC players
Zamalek SC players
Egyptian footballers
Egyptian Premier League players
People from Faiyum Governorate
Association football fullbacks